Usansolo is a neighbourhood located in the east side of Galdakao (Biscay) in Spain, 2 km away from the town center. With few baserris, its population began rising after the railway station was built in the 19th century, when flats started being built.  It has 3,696 inhabitants as of 2005. Due to its distance from the town center, there have been some initiatives to make it independent. Usansolo is home to a Bridgestone tire cord plant.

Famous people
 Idoia Zenarrutzabeitia Beldarrain

External links 
Page about Lekue Tower at the web of Galdakao Town Council

Populated places in Biscay